State Route 88 (SR 88) is a west-east state highway in West Tennessee. The  route traverses Lauderdale and Crockett Counties.

Route description

Lauderdale County 
SR 88 begins at a dead end overlooking the Mississippi River within Chickasaw National Wildlife Refuge. It intersects SR 181 at Hales Point. SR 88 heads east, and turns right onto an old alignment of US 51 (SR 3) after intersecting the current alignment near Halls. SR 88 has junctions with State Routes 210 and 209 before turning eastward once again at Gates.

Crockett County 
SR 88 then traverses the town of Maury City and Alamo. SR 88 in Alamo and Bells, including a concurrency with SR 54, runs on an old alignment with US 412 (SR 20), the southernmost intersection of which is the eastern terminus of SR 88.

History 
At one time, SR 88 once connected with Arkansas Highway 18 into Mississippi County, Arkansas via a ferry on the Mississippi River. It has long since been decommissioned.

Major intersections

References

External links
Tennessee Department of Transportation

088 
088 
088